The Woman I Am is the fourth studio album by American country music artist Kellie Pickler. It was released on November 11, 2013 via Black River Entertainment.  The album includes the singles "Someone Somewhere Tonight," "Little Bit Gypsy," and "Closer to Nowhere."

Content
The Woman I Am was produced by Frank Liddell and Luke Wooten, the same team who produced Pickler's third album, 100 Proof. Pickler co-wrote three of the album's twelve tracks, all of which she co-wrote with the help of husband and songwriter Kyle Jacobs.

"Someone Somewhere Tonight," a song previously recorded by both Kenny Rogers and Pam Tillis, was released as the album's lead single on May 14, 2013. After eight weeks, it reached a peak of number 49 on the Billboard Country Airplay chart in July 2013. "Little Bit Gypsy" and "Closer to Nowhere" were released as the album's second and third singles, peaking at number 50 and number 59, respectively.

Critical reception

The Woman I Am garnered critical acclaim from music critics. At Metacritic, they assign a "weighted average" score to ratings and reviews from mainstream critics, which based upon four reviews the album has a Metascore of an 82, and this signifies "universal acclaim". At USA Today, Brian Mansfield felt that Pickler's "albums are as much fun as hearing her talk." Stephen Thomas Erlewine at Allmusic claimed that this album was not one "that makes a career, but rather one that helps a career be built." At Rolling Stone, Rob Tannenbaum alluded to how Pickler "continues to [write] vibrant drama from her crazy family". Glenn Gamboa for Newday highlighted that "With 'The Woman I Am,' Pickler shows how the next phase of her career may be bigger than she ever dreamed." At Entertainment Weekly, they said Pickler "ditches modish pop-country for old school songs about cheating and her pistol-packin' great grandma", and felt that "she shines brightest on the autobiographical title track." At Music Is My Oxygen, Rob Burkhardt noted that her underrated status was "poised to change" because the album will put "her in a position to come into her own." Furthermore, Burkhardt told that the release comes "with the perfect combination of old and new, spunk and honesty."

At Country Weekly, Tammy Ragusa evoked that "Kellie has made a natural evolution while managing to stay true to those things that are important to her" on the release. Also, Ragusa claimed that "with her commitment to the integrity of her music and sound, she’s definitely a female force to be reckoned with." Blake Boldt of Engine 145 noted how with this release Pickler "affirms her status as an authentic personality and, more importantly, an intelligent picker of songs." In addition, Boldt wrote that for the duration of the album Kellie "proves how a current hitmaker can emphasize the genre’s traditions while still engaging with contemporary sounds and themes", which this allow her "to resurrect the past and move it into the future." At Roughstock, Matt Bjorke proclaimed that "Kellie's 12 tracks on The Woman I Am are some of the best music she's made." Donna Block at Got Country Online proclaimed that "There are even more Kellie-country gems on the album", which is why "Country music fans will agree, we are all thankful Kellie has found her sound, herself, and shares it with all of us."

Track listing

Personnel
 Jessi Alexander - background vocals
 Jimmy Carter - bass guitar
 J.T. Corenflos - electric guitar
 Justin Davis - electric guitar
 Fred Eltringham - drums, percussion
 Kalisa Ewing - background vocals
 Aubrey Haynie - fiddle
 Kyle Jacobs - acoustic guitar
 Rob McNelley - electric guitar
 Greg Morrow - drums
 Kellie Pickler - lead vocals
 Jon Randall - background vocals
 Mike Rojas - piano
 Rivers Rutherford - background vocals
 Randy Scruggs - acoustic guitar
 Chris Stapleton - background vocals
 Bryan Sutton - acoustic guitar
 Russell Terrell - background vocals
 Guthrie Trapp - electric guitar
 Luke Wooten - electric guitar, percussion, background vocals
 Glenn Worf - bass guitar
 Sarah Zimmermann - acoustic guitar

Chart performance
The album debuted at No. 19 in the Billboard 200, and No. 4 in the Top Country Albums chart, with sales of 16,000.

Album

Singles

References

2013 albums
Black River Entertainment albums
Kellie Pickler albums
Albums produced by Frank Liddell